Who Ride Wit Us: Tha Compalation, Vol. 1 is the first compilation album by American West Coast hip hop recording artist Daz Dillinger. It was released on October 30, 2001 through D.P.G. Recordz. A sequel to this album, Who Ride wit Us: Tha Compalation, Vol. 2, was released on October 29, 2002.

Track listing
Git Cha Walk On feat. Xzibit & WC
I Don't Know Why feat. Lucc Lucciono
We Yell Hey Hoo feat. C-Murder
Hustlaz feat. Young Bleed & Homeyz
Crippin' feat. C-Bo
Here We Go Now feat. Hit From Tha LBC
Who Wants 2 Be a Dope M.C.? feat. Helter Skelter & Kurupt
Don't Be Foolish feat. Snoop Dogg & Kurupt
O/G 2 Me feat. Scarface & Kurupt
Clocc'n C Notes feat. Made Men, Tray Deee, Kurupt & Soopafly
We Came feat. E-40, The Click, Snoop Dogg, Nate Dogg, Kurupt
What Ya Gonna Do? feat. Doggy's Angels
It Might Sound Crazy (Remix) feat. Too Short
Your Love Is tha Shit feat. SFTP
Animalz feat. 3Tre Tha Hardway
Put tha Monkey in It feat. Soopafly
Westside and Eastside feat. MC Eiht
Bustaz feat. Lil' C-Style, Legaci, Tray Deee, RBX
U Make Me Wanna feat. Usher
Why Oh Why? feat. Warren G & Kurupt
Turf Stories feat. Mac Shawn & Tray Deee
Affiliated feat. 3Tre Tha Hardway & Woo
Play feat. J Lo
Fyde Ryde feat. Sherm & Tex Mex
Do You Know What You Talkin' About? feat. Young Weee

References

External links 

Daz Dillinger compilation albums
Albums produced by Battlecat (producer)
Albums produced by Daz Dillinger
Albums produced by DJ Aladdin
Albums produced by Fredwreck
Albums produced by Jermaine Dupri
Albums produced by L.T. Hutton
Albums produced by Mike Dean (record producer)
Albums produced by Soopafly
Albums produced by Warren G
2001 compilation albums
Gangsta rap compilation albums
G-funk compilation albums